Burnard may refer to:

Philip Burnard Ayres (1813–1863), British physician, botanist and plant collector
Bonnie Burnard (1945–2017), Canadian short story writer and novelist
Lou Burnard (born 1946), expert in digital humanities, text encoding and digital libraries
Neville Northey Burnard (1818–1878), 19th-century English sculptor
Norah Telford Burnard (1902–1979), New Zealand school dental supervisor and journal editor
Robert Burnard (1799/1800–1846–1847), Cornish painter
Trevor Burnard (born 1961), professor of American history at the University of Melbourne
Verna Burnard (born 1956), Australian sprinter
Richard Burnard Munday (1896–1932), English flying ace with nine aerial victories during World War I
Renfrey Burnard Potts (1925–2005), Australian mathematician notable for the Potts model
Hector Burnard White (1900–1969), Australian politician

See also
Barnard
Bernard